Three ships of the Royal Navy have borne the name HMS Andrew:

 was a carrack captured in 1417.  She foundered in 1420.
 was a 42-gun ship launched in 1622.  She was known as Andrew during the English Commonwealth, but returned to being named St Andrew after the Restoration. She was wrecked in 1666.
 was an  launched in 1946 and broken up in 1977.

See also

Royal Navy ship names